Dan's City Used Cars, Inc. v. Pelkey, 569 U.S. 251 (2013), was a United States Supreme Court case in which the Court ruled that federal laws deregulating the transportation industry do not invalidate corresponding state provisions that regulate the seizure, storage, and sale of cars by towing companies. Robert Pelkey sued Dan's City Used Cars under New Hampshire law for unlawfully selling his vehicle. A lower court raised doubts as to whether the New Hampshire statute was valid at all, as Dan's City argued it was pre-empted by federal deregulation law, specifically, the Federal Aviation Administration Authorization Act, and the case eventually arrived before the Supreme Court. Agreeing with Pelkey, the justices named several conditions necessary for federal law to override state transportation regulations and narrowed the range of state transport laws subject to pre-emption.

See also 
2012 term opinions of the Supreme Court of the United States

References

External links
 

United States Supreme Court cases
United States Supreme Court cases of the Roberts Court
2013 in United States case law